Manas Rhino Passenger is a 24 coach passenger train of the Indian Railways which runs between New Bongaigaon Junction railway station of New Bongaigaon in Assam to Guwahati railway station in Assam.

Arrival and departure
 Train no. 55801 departs from New Bongaigaon, daily at 04:50, reaching Guwahati the same day at 09:15.
 Train no. 55802 departs from Guwahati daily at 17:30. from platform no.5 reaching New Bongaigaon the same day at 21:53.

Average speed and frequency
The train runs with an average speed of 37 km/h. The train runs on daily basis.

Loco link
The train is hauled by SGUJ WDP-4/WDP-4B/WDP-4D diesel locomotive.

Notes

References

Transport in Guwahati
Rail transport in Assam
Slow and fast passenger trains in India